Marion Naifeh (born April 11, 1928) is an American author and former educator who, with her husband, the late diplomat George Naifeh, represented the United States in diplomatic missions in the Middle East, Africa and South Asia over nearly three decades. As an author, Naifeh has published two books. Her 2003 publication, The Last Missionary in China, was described by noted Harvard University sinologist Ezra Vogel as "a touching, well-written, well-researched account of the life and times of a missionary who died in China in 1951 after 34 years there, by his daughter. Objective, nuanced, broad-gauged" Naifeh's 2016 book, Foreign Service, chronicles her family's life in the U.S. diplomatic corps during the 1950s, 1960s and 1970s.

Early life
Naifeh was born to missionary parents in Wuhu, China, in 1928. Her father, B. W. Lanphear (1886-1951), was headmaster of the St. James Middle School in Wuhu, China. Her mother, Carolyn March (1889-1928), worked in the YWCA in Tientsin, China. Naifeh's mother died soon after giving birth to her daughter, who was subsequently raised by two servants in her missionary household.

Although Naifeh had no biological siblings, her father unofficially adopted 16 Chinese children who were orphans or otherwise abandoned, and she grew up with four of them – George, William, Jimmie and Stephen – whom Naifeh considered to be like brothers to her. Naifeh's first language was Chinese; at age three, she is said to have told her father, in Chinese, “Foreign Devil, leave my land!” Naifeh's father sent her to Worcester, Massachusetts, where she was raised by relatives and where she learned English and, eventually, Spanish, French, Russian and Arabic.

Naifeh spent her youth shuffling between boarding schools in China – the American schools in Nanking, Kuling and Shanghai – and Worcester. She graduated from Classical High School in Worcester in 1945 and entered Wheaton College the following year.

Naifeh participated in the first year of the Smith Junior Year Abroad Program, spending a year in Puebla and in Mexico City, where she attended the Colegio de Mexico. She entered the Paul H. Nitze School of Advanced International Studies at Johns Hopkins University in 1949 to study International Economics, graduating with a master's degree in 1950.

On February 3, 1951, Naifeh married fellow-SAIS student George Naifeh, and soon thereafter the couple moved to their first diplomatic post in Meshed, Iran.

Career

Teaching career

Naifeh’s father told her from an early age that he wanted her to become a teacher, advice which she was initially determined to ignore. Nevertheless, Naifeh enjoyed a productive career teaching in several different kinds of schools, across four continents, throughout more than six decades.

She taught English and English Literature at the university level at the University of Tulsa, the University of Benghazi, Georgetown University, Paul H. Nitze School of Advanced International Studies at Johns Hopkins University in Washington, D.C., and the Second Foreign Language Institute in Beijing.

Naifeh homeschooled her two young children in a one-room school house in Baida, Libya, and taught high-school English Literature at a public school in Silver Spring, Maryland, as well as English and English Literature at the Umm Ammar Girls’ Secondary School in Abu Dhabi, UAE. She taught literacy classes in Lagos, Nigeria, and writing in a GED program in Gloverville, South Carolina.

Foreign postings

In Meshed, Iran, Naifeh worked as assistant to the American consul. All Americans were ordered to leave the city in 1952, due to the political turmoil that resulted a year later in the overthrow of Prime Minister Mohammad Mossadegh. Marion and George Naifeh moved to the capital city of Tehran, where she worked in the visa section and he served as the radio officer. Before Mossadegh was ultimately overthrown, the Naifehs left for Baghdad, Iraq, where they served in The American Friends of the Middle East, an organization founded by journalist Dorothy Thompson.

The Naifehs returned to the United States in 1956, re-entering private life and briefly running a beverage company in Tulsa, Oklahoma. They returned to the Foreign Service in 1961, moving to Baida, a new capital of Libya, and the smallest U.S. embassy in the world at the time. Naifeh's husband served as public affairs officer, both in Baida and eventually in the nearby city of Benghazi.

From Benghazi, the Naifehs were assigned to the Nigerian capital of Lagos, where George served as cultural affairs officer. They moved again, to the American consulate in Karachi, Pakistan, where he also served as cultural affairs officer.

After a year spent in Minneapolis, Minnesota, where George served as diplomat in residence at the University of Minnesota, the Naifehs went abroad again 1974 to Abu Dhabi, capital of the United Arab Emirates, where he served as public affairs officer. Four years later they moved to their last post, Amman, Jordan, not far from Ajlun, the Jordanian town where Naifeh’s father-in-law was born, before emigrating to the United States at age 10.

Married life

Marion and George Naifeh had one child, the author and entrepreneur Steven Naifeh (b. 1952), while living in Tehran, Iran, but lost their second child, Roger (1954), in Baghdad. Marion almost died after the child was stillborn, so she went to Tulsa, Oklahoma, to await the birth of their third child, Carolyn (b. 1956).

Naifeh was accustomed to a tumultuous life marked by frequent moves. In addition to leaving Meshed in 1952 due to political strife, Naifeh had been evacuated earlier from China in 1941 due to the Sino-Japanese War, be evacuated along with her husband and daughter from Libya during the Six-Day War of 1967, and finally from Pakistan during the Pakistan-India War of 1971.

Marion and George Naifeh returned to the United States for good in 1980, moving to Washington, D.C., where George cofounded the American-Arab Affairs Council, later renamed the Middle East Policy Council. The couple retired to Aiken, South Carolina, in 1998. George Naifeh died in 2006.

Dates of residence

Bibliography

Published Works:
 “One-Room Schoolhouse,” Foreign Service Journal, 1964.
 The Last Missionary in China. Aiken, SC: Woodward/White, 2003.
 Foreign Service: A Memoir. Aiken, SC: Woodward/White, 2016.

References

1928 births
Living people
American women writers
People from Wuhu
People from Aiken, South Carolina
American expatriates in China
Wheaton College (Massachusetts) alumni
Smith College alumni
American expatriates in Mexico
American expatriates in Iran
American expatriates in Iraq
American expatriates in Libya
American expatriates in Nigeria
American expatriates in Pakistan
American expatriates in the United Arab Emirates
American expatriates in Jordan